KFPW-FM (94.5 MHz) is an American commercial radio station located in Barling, Arkansas, broadcasting to the Fort Smith, Arkansas, area.  KFPW-FM airs an active rock music format from Citadel Media's The Nerve and is branded as "The Fort 94.5".

External links

FPW
Active rock radio stations in the United States
Fort Smith metropolitan area
1987 establishments in Arkansas